Skinnskatteberg Church (Swedish: Skinnskattebergs kyrka) is a church in Skinnskatteberg, Sweden. It was built between 1858 and 1863, and was inaugurated in 1865.

The Baptismal font is made of brass and was produced in 1684. It was a gift from Lars Nilsson.

References

19th-century Church of Sweden church buildings
Churches completed in 1863
Buildings and structures in Västmanland County
Gothic Revival church buildings in Sweden